Vlado Smokvina (5 May 1908 – 16 April 1982) was a Yugoslav swimmer. He competed in two events at the 1924 Summer Olympics.

References

External links
 

1908 births
1982 deaths
Croatian male swimmers
Yugoslav male swimmers
Olympic swimmers of Yugoslavia
Swimmers at the 1924 Summer Olympics
Sportspeople from Rijeka